The 2006 CPISRA Football 7-a-side European Championships was the European championship for men's national 7-a-side association football teams. CPISRA stands for Cerebral Palsy International Sports & Recreation Association. Athletes with a physical disability competed. The Championship took place in Ireland from 21 to 28 July 2006.

Football 7-a-side was played with modified FIFA rules. Among the modifications were that there were seven players, no offside, a smaller playing field, and permission for one-handed throw-ins. Matches consisted of two thirty-minute halves, with a fifteen-minute half-time break. The Championships was a qualifying event for the 2007 CPISRA Football 7-a-side World Championships.

Participating teams and officials

Teams

The draw 
During the draw, the teams were divided into pots because of rankings. Here, the following groups:

Squads 
The individual teams contact following football gamblers on to:

Group 1

Group 2

Venues 
The venues to be used for the European Championships were located in Dublin.

Format 

The first round, or group stage, was a competition between the 8 teams divided among two groups of four, where each group engaged in a round-robin tournament within itself. The two highest ranked teams in each group advanced to the knockout stage for the position one to four. The next two teams played for the position five to eight. The last teams played for the position nine to ten. Teams were awarded three points for a win and one for a draw. When comparing teams in a group over-all result came before head-to-head.

In the knockout stage there were two rounds (semi-finals, and the final). The winners plays for the higher positions, the losers for the lower positions. For any match in the knockout stage, a draw after 60 minutes of regulation time was followed by two 10 minute periods of extra time to determine a winner. If the teams were still tied, a penalty shoot-out was held to determine a winner.

Classification
Athletes with a physical disability competed. The athlete's disability was caused by a non-progressive brain damage that affects motor control, such as cerebral palsy, traumatic brain injury or stroke. Athletes must be ambulant.

Players were classified by level of disability.
 C5: Athletes with difficulties when walking and running, but not in standing or when kicking the ball.
 C6: Athletes with control and co-ordination problems of their upper limbs, especially when running.
 C7: Athletes with hemiplegia.
 C8: Athletes with minimal disability; must meet eligibility criteria and have an impairment that has impact on the sport of football.

Teams must field at least one class C5 or C6 player at all times. No more than two players of class C8 are permitted to play at the same time.

Group stage 
The first round, or group stage, have seen the ten teams divided into two groups of five teams.

Group 1

Group 2

Knockout stage

Semi-finals 
Position 5-8

Position 1-4

Finals 
Position 7-8

Position 5-6

Position 3-4

Final

Statistics

Goalscorers 
6 goals
  Vitaliy Trushev

5 goals

  Taras Dutko
  Stephan Lokhoff

4 goals

  Michael Barker
  Pavel Borisov
  Volodymyr Kabsnov
  Gary Messett
  Finbar O'Riordan
  Andriy Tsukanov
  Ivan Vazquez

3 goals

  Volodymyr Antonyuk
  Alexey Chesmin
  Sergio Clemente
  Paul Dollard
  Andrey Kuvaev
  Ivan Potekhin
  Pavel Sizov
  Matijn Van De Ven
  Yordi Lopez

2 goals

  &  Richard Fox
  Oleksandr Devlysh
  Ihor Kosenko
  Andrei Lozhecnikov
  Joseph Markey
  Sergiy Babiy
  Vitaliy Trushev
  John Swinkles

1 goal

  Sergio Alvarez
  &  Dominic Benn
  Jeffrey Bruinier
  Carlos Lopez
  &  Gary Davies
  Ruben Dehass
  Ramon Dell Pino
  Rolan Dzhanaev
  Luke Evans
  Darren Kavanagh
  Jussi Laurila
  Barry Manson
  Pedro Rocha
  Ivan Shkvarlo
  &  Andy Taylor
  David Tetelepta
  Richard Van Amerongen
  Neil Walsh
  ??
  ??
  ??

Ranking

See also

References

External links 
 2006 European Championships Dublin
 Cerebral Palsy International Sports & Recreation Association (CPISRA)
 International Federation of Cerebral Palsy Football (IFCPF)

2006–07 in European football
International association football competitions hosted by the Republic of Ireland
International sports competitions hosted by University College Dublin
2006 in Republic of Ireland association football
Paralympic association football
2000s in Dublin (city)